In abstract algebra, a partial groupoid (also called halfgroupoid, pargoid, or partial magma) is a set endowed with a partial binary operation.

A partial groupoid is a partial algebra.

Partial semigroup 

A partial groupoid  is called a partial semigroup if the following associative law holds:

  if and only if 
 and  if  (and, because of 1., also ).

References

Further reading 
 

Algebraic structures